Heather J. Sharkey (born 1967) is an American historian of the Middle East and Africa, and of the modern Christian and Islamic worlds. Her books and articles have covered topics relating to nationalism, imperialism, colonialism, postcolonial studies, missionary movements, religious communities, and language politics, especially in Egypt and Sudan.  She is currently Professor of Middle Eastern and Islamic Studies in the Department of Near Eastern Languages and Civilizations at the University of Pennsylvania in the United States.

Career 

Heather J. Sharkey was born and raised in New Jersey.  She graduated from Peddie School, and then won a scholarship from the English-Speaking Union to attend Culford School in Bury St. Edmunds, England, for one year.  As an undergraduate, she attended Yale, where she received a bachelor's degree in Anthropology, summa cum laude and became a member of Phi Beta Kappa. She won a Marshall Scholarship from the British government and attended Durham University, where she earned an MPhil degree in Modern Middle East Studies.  She pursued her PhD in History at Princeton University, where she specialized in the study of modern Africa and modern Islamic thought.  Her dissertation, supervised by Robert L. Tignor, received Honorable Mention for the Malcolm H. Kerr Dissertation Award in the humanities from the Middle East Studies Association (MESA).

Before joining the faculty at the University of Pennsylvania in 2002, Sharkey taught at the University of Massachusetts, Amherst (1997–98); the Massachusetts Institute of Technology (MIT) (1998-2000); and Trinity College in Hartford, Connecticut (2000-2).  She was a visiting professor (Professeur Invité) at the Institut d’études de l’Islam et des sociétés du monde musulman (IISMM) of the École des Hautes Études en Sciences Sociales (EHESS) in Paris (2012–13).

Scholarship 

Sharkey's first book, Living with Colonialism: Nationalism and Culture in the Anglo-Egyptian Sudan, appeared from the University of California Press in 2003, and received Honorable Mention for the Albert Hourani Book Award of the Middle East Studies Association (MESA). This book examines how nationalism emerged among a generation of Sudanese Muslim thinkers who worked by day for the British colonial regime, holding mundane jobs, and who gathered by night to compose Arabic poetry and to write essays that enabled them to imagine the Sudan as a land and nation.  The book shows how everyday experiences of colonial rule gave rise to cultures of nationalism.

Sharkey's second book, American Evangelicals in Egypt: Missionary Encounters in an Age of Empire, appeared from Princeton University Press in 2008.  This book studies the history of the American Presbyterian missionaries who, from 1854 to 1967, operated the largest Protestant mission in Egypt, while operating schools, hospitals, and other institutions that appealed to Egyptians Christians and Muslims alike.  Sharkey shows how these American missionaries influenced Egyptian society in far-reaching ways, even in the absence of conversions, and how experiences in Egypt reciprocally influenced the missionaries and the church that sent them, with consequences for American Protestant culture and U.S.-Egyptian relations more broadly.

Cambridge University Press published Sharkey's third book, A History of Muslims, Christians, and Jews in the Middle East, in 2017.  Written for Cambridge's Contemporary Middle East series, this book appeals to an audience of general educated readers as well as Middle East history specialists.  This book shows how Islamic states – and especially the modern Ottoman state – managed religious diversity while devising specific policies towards Muslims, Christians, Jews and members of other religious groups.  Sharkey closely studies Ottoman policies towards non-Muslims as dhimmis – protected people subordinate to Muslims in Islamic societies.  She considers how these policies evolved or persisted amid social changes and reforms of the nineteenth century, some of which ostensibly tried to promote religious equality while advancing ideas about citizenship.  Ultimately, she considers how religion “worked” as a framework for government and society, and how it shaped social attitudes and expectations in the years leading up to World War I – with consequences for the Middle East in the twentieth and early twenty-first centuries.

Sharkey has also published three volumes of essays.  The first, co-edited with Mehmet Ali Doğan of Istanbul Technical University, is American Missionaries in the Modern Middle East: Foundational Encounters.  This book appeared from the University of Utah Press in 2011.  The second, Cultural Conversions: Unexpected Consequences of Christian Missionary Encounters in the Middle East, Africa, and South Asia, appeared from Syracuse University Press in 2013.  Building on this work, Sharkey has written many articles on the history of Christian missions and world Christianity.  With Jeffrey Edward Green, she published The Changing Terrain of Religious Freedom, which appeared from the University of Pennsylvania Press in 2021.

With Elena Vezzadini (CNRS, Institut des mondes africaines [IMAF], Paris) and Iris Seri-Hersch (Université d’Aix-Marseille), she edited in 2015 a special issue of the Canadian Journal of African Studies, on the theme of “Rethinking Sudan Studies” after the 2011 secession of South Sudan.  Her own article in this collection traces the life and “afterlives” of a giraffe who went from Sudan to France in 1826 (and whose skeleton still stands on display in the Muséum d'Histoire naturelle de La Rochelle).  This article contributes to the study of Franco-Sudanese relations and environmental history in the Nile Valley.

Awards and Distinctions 

Upon graduating from Yale, Sharkey became a Marshall Scholar to the United Kingdom, where she attended Durham University and earned an MPhil degree in Modern Middle Eastern Studies.  She studied Arabic at the American University in Cairo, first, when she was an undergraduate at Yale, in the summer program of the Center for Arabic Study Abroad (CASA) and years later, when she was an assistant professor at Trinity College, in the CASA III summer program for faculty members.  She has received research grants from the American-Scandinavian Foundation, the American Philosophical Society, and other organizations.  She is a past recipient of a Fulbright-Hays Fellowship, Whiting Fellowship in the Humanities, Josephine De Kármán Fellowship, and Carnegie Scholars Fellowship.  She won the Charles Ludwig Distinguished Teaching Award from the College of Arts and Sciences of the University of Pennsylvania in 2011.

References 

1967 births
Living people
21st-century American historians
Marshall Scholars
Princeton University alumni
University of Pennsylvania faculty
Yale University alumni
Peddie School alumni
People educated at Culford School
Historians from New Jersey
Alumni of Durham University Graduate Society
Fulbright alumni